Boris Abramovich Goykhman (28 April 1919 – 28 October 2005) was a Soviet water polo player who competed for the Soviet Union in the 1952 Summer Olympics, in the 1956 Summer Olympics, and in the 1960 Summer Olympics.

He was Jewish, and was born in Voznesensk, Ukrainian SSR.

In 1952 he was a member of the Soviet team which finished seventh in the Olympic water polo tournament. He played all nine matches as goalkeeper.

Four years later he won the bronze medal with the Soviet team in the water polo competition at the 1956 Games. He played six matches as goalkeeper.

At the 1960 Games he was part of the Soviet team which competed in the Olympic water polo tournament. He played four matches as goalkeeper. On 3 September 1960, he won an Olympic silver medal at the age of 41 years and 128 days, becoming the oldest Olympic silver medalist in water polo.

See also
 Soviet Union men's Olympic water polo team records and statistics
 List of Olympic medalists in water polo (men)
 List of men's Olympic water polo tournament goalkeepers
 List of select Jewish water polo players

References

External links
 

1919 births
2005 deaths
People from Voznesensk
Ukrainian Jews
Soviet Jews
Soviet male water polo players
Ukrainian male water polo players
Water polo goalkeepers
Olympic water polo players of the Soviet Union
Water polo players at the 1952 Summer Olympics
Water polo players at the 1956 Summer Olympics
Water polo players at the 1960 Summer Olympics
Olympic silver medalists for the Soviet Union
Olympic bronze medalists for the Soviet Union
Olympic medalists in water polo
Burials in Troyekurovskoye Cemetery
Medalists at the 1960 Summer Olympics
Medalists at the 1956 Summer Olympics
Sportspeople from Mykolaiv Oblast